Quilmes city is the capital of the Quilmes Partido, Buenos Aires Province, Argentina

Quilmes may also refer to:
Quilmes people tribe of the  Diaguitas Native American groups.
Ruins of Quilmes, archaeological site in Tucumán Province.
Quilmes Partido, subdivision of the Buenos Aires Province.
Quilmes Atlético Club, football club from Quilmes city.
Quilmes de Mar del Plata, football club from Mar del Plata city.
Cerveza Quilmes, one of the most popular beers in Argentina.
Quilmes Rock, a major Argentine music festival.